New Brunswick Theological Seminary is a Christian seminary affiliated with the Reformed Church in America (RCA), a mainline Reformed Protestant denomination in Canada and the United States that follows the theological tradition and Christian practice of John Calvin. The seminary offers that offers professional and graduate degree programs for candidates for ministry and those pursuing careers in academia.  The seminary also offers certificates and training programs to lay church leaders seeking advanced courses.  For over 230 years, the seminary's faculty and alumni have taken key roles in the ministry of the Reformed Church and other Christian denominations, in academia, and in the professional world.

Founded in 1784, New Brunswick Theological Seminary is the oldest seminary in the United States and one of seminaries operated by the Reformed Church in America.  It currently has two campuses: Its main campus, built in 1856, in New Brunswick, New Jersey adjacent to the campus of Rutgers University and its newer campus, opened in 1986, on the grounds of St. John's University in the Jamaica neighborhood of Queens, New York.  While rooted in the Reformed faith, the Seminary is dedicated to providing a comprehensive Christian education as "an inter-cultural, ecumenical school of Christian faith, learning, and scholarship committed to its metro-urban and global contexts."

Leaders of the Seminary
The board of trustees appoints a president to serve as the seminary's chief administrative and executive officer. The current seminary president is Rev. Micah L. McCreary, M.Div., Ph.D., who has served in that capacity since 2017.    The current Vice President and Dean of Academic Affairs is Rev. Beth Tanner, Ph.D.

The seminary's first leader was the Rev. John Henry Livingston, who was appointed in 1784 to start instructing candidates for ministry. He began to do so in his New York City home, and a few years moved the seminary to Flatbush. In 1810, Livingston accepted the presidency of Queen's College in New Brunswick, New Jersey (now Rutgers, The State University of New Jersey), and moved the seminary to that city.

The title of President of the Seminary was first used with regard to the administrator of the school in 1923. Previously, the role had been known as Dean of the Seminary from 1883 to 1888 and filled by the oldest professor in years of service who would be entrusted with the management of the seminary.  That title became President of the Faculty'' from 1888 to 1923. Today, the president of the seminary is simultaneously appointed to the John Henry Livingston Professor of Theology, created upon the recommendation of outgoing president M. Stephen James. In 1959, James was appointed to the chair in an emeritus capacity, and the chair was first occupied by the seminary's eight president, Justin Vander Kolk.

Faculty
Faculty members listed below in bold text were also alumni of the New Brunswick Theological Seminary.
 William Henry Campbell, (1808–1890), professor of Oriental Languages, later eighth President of Rutgers College (1862–1882).
 William Henry Steele Demarest (1863–1956), NBTS Professor of Ecclesiastical History and Church Government, eleventh president of Rutgers University (1906–1924), president of NBTS (1925–1934)
 Philip Milledoler (1775–1852), professor of didactic theology, fifth president of Rutgers College (1825–1840)

Alumni
 B.D. = Bachelor of Divinity
 M.Div. = Master of Divinity
 M.A. or A.M. = Master of Arts
 D.Min = Doctor of Ministry

See also
 List of Rutgers University people
 List of colleges and universities in New Jersey

References

Notes

Citations

External links
 New Brunswick Theological Seminary

New Brunswick Theological Seminary people
New Brunswick Theological Seminary people
New Brunswick Theological Seminary List